Dr Bhushan Lal Jangde is a Bharatiya Janata Party (BJP) politician. He was a Member of Parliament, representing Chhattisgarh in the Rajya Sabha the upper house of Indian Parliament succeeded by Saroj Pandey.

He is an Ayurveda physician.

References

External links
Bhushan Lal Jangde - Rajya Sabha Profile 

1943 births
Bharatiya Janata Party politicians from Chhattisgarh
Living people
People from Baloda Bazar district
Rajya Sabha members from Chhattisgarh
Rajya Sabha members from the Bharatiya Janata Party